Jean-François Chevrier is an art theorist and historian, art critic and exhibition curator. He lives and works in Paris. He is Professor in the History of Contemporary Art at the École nationale supérieure des Beaux-Arts in Paris, after having thought at the Université Paris-Nanterre and Paris VIII.

In his essays Chevrier has examined the place of photography – and by extension modern and contemporary art – among the arts and the media.

Exhibitions and catalogues he has curated and co-edited include Matter of Facts (Nantes et al., 1988), Une autre objectivité / Another Objectivity (London, 1988), Photo Kunst (Stuttgart, 1989), Craigie Horsfield (London, 1989), Lieux communs, figures singulières (Paris, 1991), Walker Evans and Dan Graham (Rotterdam, 1992) and Craigie Horsfield. La ciutat de la gent (Barcelona, 1996). He has written essays on Jean-Marc Bustamante, John Coplans, Ken Lum, Michelangelo Pistoletto, Gerhard Richter and Brassaï.

References

External links
 A selected bibliography of Chevrier's writings
 Jean-François Chevrier portrait in Critique d'art N°36, 2010 (fr) by Marie Muracciole

French art historians
Academic staff of the École des Beaux-Arts
Living people
Writers from Paris
French male non-fiction writers
French art curators
1954 births